Frank Dudley Foster (7 August 1924 – 8 January 1973) was an English actor who regularly appeared in television roles.

Foster was born in Brighouse, West Riding of Yorkshire. His family had established links with the theatre and a brother and sister also appeared on the stage. They were the children of Frank Geden Foster, a civil engineer, who was to die exactly a week before his son. Educated at Pocklington School, Dudley Foster after service as a navigator in the RAF studied chemistry at the University of Leeds. In 1948 he joined the recently-formed Bradford Civic Playhouse Theatre School and after turning professional spent several successful years with northern repertory companies. From the later 1950s into the 1960s, he was a member of Joan Littlewood's Theatre Workshop based at London's Theatre Royal Stratford East. In her autobiography Joan's Book  Littlewood recalled that Foster had a wealthy father who financed some of the troupe's productions.

On television he appeared  in such series as Danger Man, The Saint, The Avengers ("The Hour That Never Was", 1965), "Something Nasty in The Nursery" (1967) and "Wish You Were Here" (1969 – playing a perfect mannered yet sinister hotel manager in a parody of the TV series The Prisoner), Randall and Hopkirk (Deceased) (in "All Work and No Pay", 1969) as villain George Foster,
The Persuaders! (1971 in the episode "Anyone Can Play", in which he played the spy network paymaster Heather), Catweazle ("The Ghost Hunters as Hector Kenley", 1971)  Steptoe and Son (four episodes: playing Martin, the oily 'card shark' in "Full House", the supercilious Labour Party rep in "My Old Man's A Tory", the pained Police Inspector in "Robbery with Violence", and uncredited as the car salesman in "The Colour Problem") and Doctor Who ("The Space Pirates", 1969), often in villainous roles.

In Z-Cars in the early 1960s he played a police detective, Inspector (later Superintendent) Dunn. He was also in Bat Out of Hell (1966), a BBC serial by Francis Durbridge, playing a formidable Police Inspector, and starred with John Bird in the office comedy series If It Moves File It (1970) by Troy Kennedy Martin. He occasionally appeared in films. He appeared in the films The Little Ones as Superintendent Carter alongside Derek Newark and in A Study in Terror (both 1965) as Home Secretary  Henry Matthews.

He also participated in a 30-minute documentary titled Two in a Tiger.  This film follows his training as he learns to fly a De Havilland Tiger Moth.

In 1970 he provided the voice-over for an edition of the BBC documentary series Chronicle: "The Great Iron Ship", about the salvage and return from the Falkland Islands of the Isambard Kingdom Brunel ship SS Great Britain.

His penultimate role was in the film version of the BBC sitcom That's Your Funeral (1972) and his final appearance was in the 18th-century-set comedy-drama Mistress Pamela which was not released until after his death. 

Foster died at 3 Holly Hill, Hampstead, NW3, in January 1973. His early death was found to be the result of suicide by hanging. He left a widow, the actress Eileen Kennally (who appeared in In Sickness and in Health); they had married in 1952 and had two sons. Foster’s estate was valued for probate at £36,535, .

Selected filmography
 The Two-Headed Spy (1958) - Gestapo Agent (uncredited)
 Operation Bullshine (1959) - Gunner (uncredited)
 The Wakefield Shepherd's Play (1961) - First Shepherd
 Term of Trial (1962) - Detective Sergeant Keirnan
 Ricochet (1963) - Peter Dexter
 Never Mention Murder (Edgar Wallace Mysteries - 1964) - Philip Teasdale
 The Little Ones (1965) - Supt. Carter
 A Study in Terror (1965) - Home Secretary
 Where's Jack? (1969) - Blueskin
 Moon Zero Two (1969) - Whitsun
 Foreign Exchange (1970, TV film) - Leo
 The Rise and Rise of Michael Rimmer (1970) - Federman
 Wuthering Heights (1970)
 Dulcima (1971) - Symes
 Quest for Love (1971) - Grimshaw
 Follow Me! (1972) - Mr. Mayhew
 That's Your Funeral (1972) - Grimthorpe
 Mistress Pamela (1973) - Jonathan (final film role)

References

External links

1924 births
1973 deaths
English male film actors
English male television actors
People from Brighouse
Suicides in Hampstead
20th-century English male actors
1973 suicides
Royal Air Force personnel of World War II
Suicides by hanging in England